Takamiyama Torinosuke (髙見山酉之助, October 25, 1873 – January 11, 1924) was a Japanese sumo wrestler.

Career
He joined Takasago stable, reaching the top makuuchi division in 1907. In the June 1909 tournament, he defeated ozeki Tachiyama and won the first official championship in the history of professional sumo. He reached his highest rank of sekiwake in January 1910. He reportedly feared facing the small but fierce Tamatsubaki Kentaro. After he retired in May 1913, he left the sumo world and returned to his hometown.

Top Division Record

See also
Glossary of sumo terms
List of past sumo wrestlers
List of sumo tournament top division champions

References

External links
 Tournament results

1873 births
1924 deaths
Japanese sumo wrestlers
Sumo people from Chiba Prefecture
Sekiwake
People from Chōshi